José Manuel "Sema" Velázquez Rodríguez, (born 8 September 1990 in Ciudad Bolívar) is a Venezuelan football defender for Portuguese club Arouca and the Venezuela national football team.

Club career
Velázquez started his career at just six when he started to play for various youth clubs in town. He made his professional debut with ACD Lara in 2007. Having made himself a regular at the age of 17, Deportivo Anzoátegui secured his services at the beginning of 2008.

He signed for Villarreal in 2009 to play for its reserve team. However, he did not feature in any match since he joined the squad, and was loaned to Venezuelan club Mineros de Guayana for the end of the 2010–11 season and the whole 2011–12 campaign.

On 7 July 2012, he signed a 3-year contract for Panathinaikos F.C.

International career
Velázquez has played at every level from Under-15 to Under-20.

International goals
As of match played 13 June 2016. Venezuela score listed first, score column indicates score after each Velázquez goal.

Under 20s
Velázquez was selected to play for Venezuela in the 2009 South American Youth Championship by César Farías, partnering Carlos Salazar in central defence. During the Round of 16 of the 2009 FIFA U-20 World Cup held in Egypt, he play the full 90 minutes against UAE but Venezuela was eventually defeated 1–2.

Senior Team
Velázquez is a member of the Venezuela national football team, having debuted on 28 March 2009 against Argentina.

Honours
Deportivo Anzoátegui SC
Copa Venezuela: 2008

AC Mineros
Copa Venezuela: 2011

References

External links
 
 
 
 Goal.com Profile
 

1990 births
Living people
People from Ciudad Bolívar
Venezuelan footballers
Venezuela international footballers
Venezuelan expatriate footballers
Association football defenders
Deportivo Anzoátegui players
Asociación Civil Deportivo Lara players
A.C.C.D. Mineros de Guayana players
Villarreal CF B players
Panathinaikos F.C. players
F.C. Arouca players
C.D. Veracruz footballers
Club Nacional footballers
Deportivo Táchira F.C. players
Super League Greece players
Primeira Liga players
Liga MX players
Paraguayan Primera División players
Expatriate footballers in Spain
Expatriate footballers in Greece
Expatriate footballers in Portugal
Expatriate footballers in Mexico
Venezuelan expatriate sportspeople in Spain
Venezuelan expatriate sportspeople in Greece
Venezuelan expatriate sportspeople in Portugal
Venezuelan expatriate sportspeople in Mexico
Venezuela under-20 international footballers
Copa América Centenario players
2021 Copa América players
Italian people of Venezuelan descent